133528 Ceragioli, provisional designation , is an asteroid of the Koronis family from the outer regions of the asteroid belt, approximately  in diameter. It was discovered on 4 October 2003, by American astronomer David Healy at the Junk Bond Observatory in Arizona, United States. The likely stony and possibly elongated asteroid has a rotation period of 3.1 hours. It was named for American optician Roger Ceragioli.

Orbit and classification 

Ceragioli is a member of the Koronis family, a very large asteroid family with nearly co-planar ecliptical orbits and named after 158 Koronis. It orbits the Sun in the outer asteroid belt at a distance of 2.6–3.1 AU once every 4 years and 10 months (1,764 days; semi-major axis of 2.86 AU). Its orbit has an eccentricity of 0.09 and an inclination of 1° with respect to the ecliptic. The body's observation arc begins with a precovery taken by Spacewatch in September 1998, or 5 years prior to its official discovery observation at the Junk Bond Observatory.

Naming 

This minor planet was named after American optician Roger Ceragioli (born 1959) at the Steward Observatory Mirror Laboratory, whose projects include parts of the Bok Telescope and the MODS spectrograph for the Large Binocular Telescope. The official  was published by the Minor Planet Center on 1 June 2007.

Physical characteristics 

Ceragioli is an assumed stony S-type asteroid, in line with the overall spectral type for members of the Koronis family.

Rotation period 

In February 2010, a rotational lightcurve of Ceragioli was obtained from photometric observations in the R-band by astronomers at the Palomar Transient Factory in California. Lightcurve analysis gave a rotation period of  hours with a brightness variation of 0.35 magnitude, indicative of an elongated shape. Also in February 2010, David Polishook determined a similar period of  hours with an amplitude of 0.25 magnitude.

Diameter and albedo 

The Collaborative Asteroid Lightcurve Link assumes an albedo of 0.24 and calculates a diameter of 1.75 kilometers based on an absolute magnitude of 15.95.

References

External links 
 Asteroid Lightcurve Database (LCDB), query form (info )
 Dictionary of Minor Planet Names, Google books
 Discovery Circumstances: Numbered Minor Planets (130001)-(135000) – Minor Planet Center
 
 

133528
Discoveries by David Healy (astronomer)
Named minor planets
20031004